Brahma Rudrulu is a 1986 Indian Telugu-language action film, produced by Ashwini Dutt under Vyjayanthi Movies and directed by K. Murali Mohana Rao. It stars Akkineni Nageswara Rao, Venkatesh, Lakshmi, Rajani and Ranjini  and music composed by Chakravarthy. The film was flop at the box office.

Plot
Justice Jagadish Chandra Prasad (Akkineni Nageswara Rao) a disciple of Justice. Once he gives judgment against a malicious politician Balagam Brahmaji (Paruchuri Gopala Krishna) that his election is not valid. Engaged Brahmaji flares-up to malic Jagadish Chandra Prasad, so, he indicts his brother-in-law Balaram (Ranganath) in a murder case for which Jagadish Chandra Prasad gives a death sentence. There onwards, his sister Kanaka Durga (Sumitra) develops hatred towards her brother and leaves the city. After 25 years, Satya Prasad / Satyam (Venkatesh) nephew of Jagadish Chandra Prasad is again indicted in a crime by Brahmaji & gang only. While escaping from the police, fortuitously, he saves Jagadish Chandra Prasad's wife Sujatha (Lakshmi) who gives him shelter where he gains their love & affection. Parallelly, Ganga (Rajani) a servant maid loves him. Since their children are vain Jagadish Chandra Prasad's couple decides to adopt Satyam. Soon after the adoption, Jagadish Chandra Prasad learns Satyam is a criminal who killed an innocent girl Jyothi (Ranjani), daughter of Marideswara Rao (Prabhakar Reddy), partner to Brahmaji and also that he is his nephew. Satyam gets arrested, Jagadish Chandra Prasad meets and seeks for reality then Satyam narrates the past. Satyam & Jyothi are love birds in the college, Balagam Raju (Banerjee) a crooked person, son of Brahmaji's elder brother who aspires to marry Jyothi always feels jealous towards Satyam. One day, in a quarrel, Raju killed Jyothi and accused Satyam. Now Jagadish Chandra Prasad wears the pleader's shoes appears in the favor of Satyam and almost on the verge of winning. So, to bar him, Brahmaji slaughters Sujatha. Nevertheless, he moves and brings out Satyam on bail. At this point in time, Jagadish Chandra Prasad decides to take avenge along with Satyam, so, they trap all the baddies and prove Satyam's innocence. Finally, Jagadish Chandra Prasad slays out Brahmaji and surrenders himself to the judiciary.

Cast

Akkineni Nageswara Rao as Justice Jagadish Chandra Prasad
Venkatesh as Satya Prasad
Lakshmi as Sujatha
Rajani as Ganga
Ranjani as Jyothi
Paruchuri Gopala Krishna as Balagam Brahmaji
Nutan Prasad as Chelamayah
Prabhakar Reddy as Marideswara Rao
Ranganath as Balaram
Rallapalli as Ganga's Brother
Benerjee as Balagam Raju
Surya as Jagadesh Chandra Prasad's son-in-law
Ramji as Ravi
Raj Varma as Kotigadu
Sumitra as Kanaka Durga
Samyutha as Nirmala
Rajitha as Jagadish Chandra Prasad's daughter 
Mandakini as item number

Crew
Art: Bhaskar Raju
Choreography: Raghu
Fights: Super Subbarayan 
Story - Dialogues: Paruchuri Brothers
Lyrics: Veturi
Playback: S. P. Balasubrahmanyam, S. Janaki, P. Susheela
Music: Chakravarthy
Editing: Kotagiri Venkateswara Rao
Cinematography: M. V. Raghu
Producer: Ashwini Dutt
Screenplay - Director: K. Murali Mohan Rao
Banner: Vyjayanthi Movies
Release Date: 14 November 1986

Soundtrack

Music composed by Chakravarthy. Lyrics were written by Veturi. Music released on LEO Audio Company.

References 

1986 films
1980s Telugu-language films
Films scored by K. Chakravarthy